Qais Essar is an Afghan-American musician, based in Phoenix, Arizona. A rabab player and songwriter, he is most noted for the song "The Crown Sleeps" from the film The Breadwinner, which won the Canadian Screen Award for Best Original Song at the 6th Canadian Screen Awards in 2018. He co-wrote the song with Joshua Hill, a bandmate in the now defunct band Qosmonauts.

Discography
 The Green Language (2014)
 Klasik (EP, 2015)
 I am Afghan, Afghani is Currency (EP, 2015)
 Tavern of Ruin (2016)
 I am Afghan, Afghani is Currency Vol 2: Beltoon (EP, 2017)
 Live in Toronto (2017)
 Misc Vol 1 (2018)
 The Ghost You Love Most (2018)

References

External links
 
 

Songwriters from Arizona
Musicians from Phoenix, Arizona
American people of Afghan descent
Best Original Song Genie and Canadian Screen Award winners
Living people
Year of birth missing (living people)
American world music musicians